The Linz State Theatre is a theatre in Linz, Austria.

References

External links 

 

Theatres in Linz
Buildings and structures in Linz
Tourist attractions in Linz
Clemens Holzmeister buildings and structures